Ādaži Airfield  is an airfield in Latvia.

The first private certified airfield in Latvia, which may receive up to 60 small private planes. The range of services includes training of ultra-light plane pilots, maintenance and repair works for planes, trade and rent of planes, as well as advertising flights.

References 

Airports in Latvia
Ādaži Municipality